The League of Women Voters of South Australia (formerly the Women's Non-Party Political Association of South Australia) was a women's organisation in South Australia from 1909 to 1979.

It was founded in June 1909 by Lucy Morice in conjunction with Victorian activist Vida Goldstein. Catherine Helen Spence became the first president, while Leonora Polkinghorne was one of the first councillors. Phyllis Duguid held numerous offices within the organisation, and was its last president before it disbanded in 1979.

References

Non-profit organisations based in South Australia
Women's organisations based in Australia
1909 establishments in Australia
Organizations established in 1909
1979 disestablishments in Australia